Kroonstad railway station is the railway station in the city of Kroonstad in the Free State province of South Africa.

Railway stations in South Africa
Transport in the Free State (province)
Moqhaka